Park Jung-Bin is a South Korean professional footballer who plays as an attacking midfielder or forward for French  club Rodez.

Club career
In 2011, Park made his debut in the Regionalliga Nord with the VfL Wolfsburg II. In the winter transfer period of the 2012–13 season, he was loaned out to SpVgg Greuther Fürth until mid of June 2014. He made his Bundesliga debut in a match against FC Bayern Munich.

On 1 September 2013, Karlsruher SC announced his transfer from Wolfsburg on a three-year contract.

After three season at Viborg FF, he left the club at the end of the 2018/19 season.

In July 2019, he was on trial at Troyes AC and played a friendly match against Villefranche.

Since October 2019, he plays for Servette FC of the Swiss Super League. He announced his departure from the club  in June 2020. He wasn’t able to agree to a new contract with the Swiss club, Servette FC.

On 30 December 2020, he has gone back to FC Seoul of the South Korean K League 1.  In 2021 he played 10 games and had a total of 378 minutes of time played on the field. On 12 May 2022, he left the club as his contract was terminated through mutual consent.

On 15 August 2022, he joined Rodez of Ligue 2.

References

External links
 
 

1994 births
Sportspeople from Busan
Living people
Association football forwards
South Korean footballers
South Korean expatriate footballers
VfL Wolfsburg II players
VfL Wolfsburg players
SpVgg Greuther Fürth players
Karlsruher SC players
Hobro IK players
Viborg FF players
Servette FC players
FC Seoul players
Rodez AF players
Bundesliga players
Danish Superliga players
Danish 1st Division players
Swiss Super League players
K League 1 players
Ligue 2 players
Expatriate footballers in Germany
Expatriate men's footballers in Denmark
Expatriate footballers in Switzerland
Expatriate footballers in France
South Korean expatriate sportspeople in Germany
South Korean expatriate sportspeople in Denmark
South Korean expatriate sportspeople in Switzerland
South Korean expatriate sportspeople in France